Marius Ninel Șumudică (born 4 March 1971) is a Romanian professional football manager and former player, he is the current manager of Saudi club Al-Raed.

Șumudică was a striker who began his senior career with Sportul Studențesc and represented five other teams in his native country, as well as Marítimo, Debrecen and Omonia abroad. Șumudică was part of Mircea Lucescu's squad that won Rapid București the national title in 1999, scoring 17 goals during the season. He also claimed two Cupa României trophies with "the Burgundy Eagles".

Șumudică began his managerial career in 2005 as an assistant at Rapid București. He brought Astra Giurgiu its first Liga I title in the 2015–16 campaign, during his third stint with the club. For that performance, Șumudică was named the 2016 Romania Coach of the Year by the Gazeta Sporturilor newspaper. Apart from his time in Romania, he has coached sides in Greece, the United Arab Emirates, Saudi Arabia, and Turkey.

Managerial career

Astra Giurgiu
On 28 April 2015, Șumudică was appointed as manager of Astra Giurgiu, following Dorinel Munteanu's resignation. It was his third term at the club, after two short spells in 2009 and 2011. He led the team to a 4th-place finish, qualifying them for the UEFA Europa League. The European campaign was almost a success, as Astra stopped short of reaching the Europa League group stages after knocking out West Ham United in the third round, but lost to AZ Alkmaar in the play-offs.

Domestically, despite the poor start which saw Astra losing 1–5 to previous runner-ups ASA Targu Mures, Astra managed to finish the regular season on first place, 3 points above Dinamo București. However, Șumudică was suspended 6 months by the Romanian FA on charges of betting on football matches. He later managed to have his sentence reduced to 2 months by appeal.  Despite of his suspension, Astra kept their momentum during the play-offs, ending up in them being crowned Liga I champions for the first time in their history, also marking Șumudică's first domestic title as manager.

After a quick exit to Danish champions Copenhagen in the UEFA Champions League, Șumudică managed to guide Astra to 2016–17 UEFA Europa League group stage eliminating West Ham – for the second time in a row – along the way, after a 1–0 win in London. In the group stages, he faced Roma, Viktoria Plzeň and Austria Wien. Despite losing the first two games of the group with Austria Wien (2–3 at Giurgiu) and Roma (0–4 in Italy), Astra managed two 2–1 away wins at Plzeň and Wien (along with a home draw with Viktoria) to stay in the race for a place in the knock-out stages. In the end, Astra's 0–0 draw with Roma and Austria Wien's failure against Plzeň in the last matchday secured Astra's place in the tournament's round of 32. There, they were eliminated by Belgian side Genk after a 2–2 draw at Giurgiu followed by 0–1 defeat in Belgium.

Astra's campaign in the league, meanwhile, was disappointing, with the team finishing 5th and losing the Romanian Cup final to FC Voluntari. However, due to Astra's position in the league and Voluntari not applying for a European license, the vacant spot was given to Astra, thus qualifying yet again in Europe.

Gaziantep
On 14 June 2019, Șumudică was appointed as manager of Turkish club Gaziantep. In January 2021, following an away defeat in the Süper Lig against Sivasspor, the club announced that they had parted ways with the Romanian manager, following a few weeks of tension and public discussion about his contract.

CFR Cluj
On 28 August 2021, CFR Cluj terminated the contract of Șumudică, ending his 3-month stint in charge after a disappointing campaign for Europe.

Al-Shabab
On 23 March 2022, Șumudică returned to manage Al-Shabab until the end of the 2021–22 season.

Al-Raed
On 30 June 2022, Șumudică was appointed as manager of Al-Raed.

Career statistics

Managerial

Honours

Player
Rapid București
Liga I: 1998–99
Cupa României: 1997–98, 2001–02

Marítimo
Taça de Portugal runner-up: 2000–01

Manager
Astra Giurgiu
Liga I: 2015–16
Supercupa României: 2016

CFR Cluj

Supercupa României runner-up: 2021

Individual
Gazeta Sporturilor Romania Coach of the Year: 2016
Saudi Professional League Manager of the Month: December 2018

References

External links

1971 births
Living people
Footballers from Bucharest
Romanian footballers
Association football forwards
AFC Dacia Unirea Brăila players
FC Sportul Studențesc București players
CS Corvinul Hunedoara players
FC Rapid București players
C.S. Marítimo players
Debreceni VSC players
AC Omonia players
FC UTA Arad players
ACF Gloria Bistrița players
Liga I players
Primeira Liga players
Nemzeti Bajnokság I players
Cypriot First Division players
Romanian expatriate footballers
Romanian expatriate sportspeople in Portugal
Romanian expatriate sportspeople in Hungary
Romanian expatriate sportspeople in Cyprus
Romanian expatriate sportspeople in Saudi Arabia
Romanian football managers
Romanian expatriate football managers
AFC Rocar București managers
FC Progresul București managers
FC Astra Giurgiu managers
FCV Farul Constanța managers
FC Rapid București managers
FC Brașov (1936) managers
FC Vaslui managers
FC Universitatea Cluj managers
Al-Shaab CSC managers
Kavala F.C. managers
Kayserispor managers
Al Shabab FC (Riyadh) managers
ACF Gloria Bistrița managers
CS Concordia Chiajna managers
CFR Cluj managers
Al-Raed FC managers
Expatriate football managers in the United Arab Emirates
Expatriate football managers in Turkey
Expatriate football managers in Saudi Arabia
Süper Lig managers
Saudi Professional League managers
FC Rapid București assistant managers